The 2020 SpeedyCash.com 400 was the 21st stock car race of the 2020 NASCAR Gander RV & Outdoors Truck Series season, the 24th iteration of the event, and the second race of the Round of 8. The race was originally going to be held on June 5, 2020, but was postponed to Sunday, October 25, 2020, due to the COVID-19 pandemic. The race was held in Fort Worth, Texas at Texas Motor Speedway, a 1.5 miles (2.4 km) permanent quad-oval racetrack. The race was extended from its scheduled 147 laps to 152 laps due to a late race wreck caused by Ben Rhodes turning Christian Eckes; much to the dismay of Eckes, Eckes would give Rhodes a double middle finger the next time Rhodes went by his car. At race's end, Sheldon Creed of GMS Racing would dominate and win the race, the 4th of the season and NASCAR Gander RV & Outdoors Truck Series career win. To fill out the podium, Austin Hill of Hattori Racing Enterprises and Zane Smith of GMS Racing would finish 2nd and 3rd, respectively.

Background 

Texas Motor Speedway is a speedway located in the northernmost portion of the U.S. city of Fort Worth, Texas – the portion located in Denton County, Texas. The track measures 1.5 miles (2.4 km) around and is banked 24 degrees in the turns, and is of the oval design, where the front straightaway juts outward slightly. The track layout is similar to Atlanta Motor Speedway and Charlotte Motor Speedway (formerly Lowe's Motor Speedway). The track is owned by Speedway Motorsports, Inc., the same company that owns Atlanta and Charlotte Motor Speedway, as well as the short-track Bristol Motor Speedway.

Entry list

Starting lineup 
The starting lineup was selected based on the results and fastest lap of the last race, the 2020 Clean Harbors 200. As a result, Sheldon Creed of GMS Racing won the pole.

Race results 
Stage 1 Laps: 35

Stage 2 Laps: 35

Stage 3 Laps: 82

References 

2020 NASCAR Gander RV & Outdoors Truck Series
NASCAR races at Texas Motor Speedway
October 2020 sports events in the United States
2020 in sports in Texas